Ernesto Montemayor may refer to:

 Ernesto Montemayor Sr. (1907–unknown), Mexican sports shooter
 Ernesto Montemayor Jr. (1928–2000), Mexican sports shooter